The Iowa United States House of Representatives election in 2008 was held on November 4, 2008 and determined who would hold Iowa's seats in the United States House of Representatives during 2009-10.  Each of the five incumbents was up for election, and each won re-election.

Overview

District 1

Democrat Bruce Braley, an attorney from Waterloo, the incumbent, was completing his first term. His Republican challenger was state Senator David Hartsuch. CQ Politics forecast the race as 'Safe Democrat'.

District 2

Democrat Dave Loebsack of Mount Vernon, a former political science professor at Cornell College, the incumbent, was also completing his first term. His Republican challenger was U.S. Army Lt. Col. (Ret.) Dr. Mariannette Miller-Meeks of Ottumwa, Iowa. He was also challenged by the Green Party's Wendy Barth and by Brian White, who was nominated by petition.  CQ Politics forecast the race as 'Safe Democrat'.

District 3

Leonard Boswell, a Democrat from Des Moines, the incumbent, was completing his sixth term. His Republican challenger was Kim Schmett and his Socialist Workers Party challenger was Frank Forrestal. CQ Politics forecast the race as 'Safe Democrat'.

District 4

Republican Tom Latham of Alexander, the incumbent, was completing his eighth term. His Democratic challenger was Becky Greenwald. CQ Politics forecast the race as 'Safe Republican'.

District 5

Steve King, a Republican from Kiron, the incumbent, was completing his third term. His Democratic challenger was Rob Hubler and was also challenged by independent candidate Victor Vara.  CQ Politics forecast the race as 'Safe Republican'.

References

External links
Candidate list from the Iowa Secretary of State's office.
U.S. Congress candidates for Iowa at Project Vote Smart
Iowa U.S. House Races from 2008 Race Tracker
Campaign contributions for Iowa congressional races from OpenSecrets

2008
Iowa
United States House of Representatives